The following lists events that happened during 2015 in China.

Incumbents

Paramount leader
General Secretary of the Communist Party – Xi Jinping

Head of state
President – Xi Jinping
Vice President – Li Yuanchao

Head of government
Premier – Li Keqiang
Vice Premiers – Zhang Gaoli, Liu Yandong, Wang Yang, Ma Kai

National legislature
Congress chairman – Zhang Dejiang

Political advisory
Conference chairman – Yu Zhengsheng

Governors 
 Governor of Anhui Province – Wang Xuejun (until June), Li Jinbin (starting June)
 Governor of Fujian Province – Su Shulin (until November), Yu Weiguo (starting November)
 Governor of Gansu Province – Liu Weiping 
 Governor of Guangdong Province – Zhu Xiaodan 
 Governor of Guizhou Province – Chen Min'er (until October), Sun Zhigang (starting October)
 Governor of Hainan Province – Jiang Dingzhi (until January), Liu Cigui (starting January)
 Governor of Hebei Province – Zhang Qingwei
 Governor of Heilongjiang Province – Lu Hao 
 Governor of Henan Province – Xie Fuzhan 
 Governor of Hubei Province – Wang Guosheng 
 Governor of Hunan Province – Du Jiahao 
 Governor of Jiangsu Province – Li Xueyong (until November), Shi Taifeng (starting November)
 Governor of Jiangxi Province – Lu Xinshe 
 Governor of Jilin Province – Jiang Chaoliang 
 Governor of Liaoning Province – Li Xi (until May), Chen Qiufa (until May)
 Governor of Qinghai Province – Hao Peng 
 Governor of Shaanxi Province – Lou Qinjian 
 Governor of Shandong Province – Guo Shuqing 
 Governor of Shanxi Province – Li Xiaopeng 
 Governor of Sichuan Province – Wei Hong
 Governor of Yunnan Province – Chen Hao 
 Governor of Zhejiang Province – Li Qiang

Events
Expected launch of Chang'e 4
Earliest date for the first flight of Long March 5

January
January 3 – The six-century-old Gongchen Tower in Weishan, Yunnan is destroyed by a fire.
January 12 – In Xinjiang, Chinese police kill six militants.

February 
 February 17 
 Chinese prosecutors say that former top Communist Party official Su Rong is under investigation for alleged corruption.
 Chinese authorities also announce the indictment of former Guangdong official Zhu Mingguo, former Jinan CPC party chief Wang Min, and former Taiyuan party chief Chen Chuanping, all on charges of corruption.
February 28
The municipal intermediate people's court for the eastern city of Dongying convicts Ni Fake, former Vice-Governor of Anhui in China, on charges of bribery and "amassing wealth of unclear origin", and sentences him to seventeen years in prison.
The Chinese People's Political Consultative Conference removes disgraced senior official Ling Jihua from the office of vice-chairman and also strips him of his ordinary delegate status.

March 
 March 6At least two knife-wielding attackers injure nine people at a train station in Guangzhou. The police fatally shoot one of the suspects.

May 
 May 4Meeting between General Secretary of the Communist Party of China Xi Jinping and Kuomintang Chairman Eric Chu in Beijing.
 May 19 Chinese Wikipedia is blocked in China.

June 
 June 1The Dong Fang Zhi Xing capsizes on the Yangtze River in Jianli County, Hubei during severe weather.

July 

 July 31International Olympic Committee selects Beijing as the host city of the 2022 Winter Olympics beating Almaty.

August 
 August 12 – More than two explosions occurred within 30 seconds of each other at a container storage station at the Port of Tianjin in the Binhai New Area of Tianjin. Over 100 were killed and hundreds are injured. There were at least 700 tonnes of highly toxic sodium cyanide stored at the site. By August 15, local authorities ordered an evacuation.

 August 31 – A chemical explosion occurred in Dongying, Shandong, killing 5 people.

September 
 September 3China's Victory over Japan Day 70th Anniversary Parade held in Beijing, the first military parade to commemorate Victory over Japan Day in the history of the People's Republic of China. Around 12,000 troops from the People's Liberation Army and more than 1,000 troops from 17 nations participated in the parade.

 September 7Explosion at Nanming Chemical Co Ltd's plant in Lishui, Zhejiang – the fourth since Tianjin, this time caused by ignited methanol. No reported casualties.
 September 3017 Explosions at Liucheng County, Guangxi. Police reported 7 deaths, 51 injuries and 2 missing. Terrorism was ruled out, while speculation centered on fast delivery packages. One suspect was detained.

October 
 October 26 to 29 – The Fifth Plenum of the 18th CPC National Congress held in Beijing. The plenum discusses about the thirteenth Five-year plans of China.

November 

 November 7 Ma Ying-jeou and Xi Jinping met in Singapore, the first such meeting between the leaders of the two sides of the Taiwan Strait since the end of the Chinese Civil War.

December 
 December 13National Memorial Day commemorating the 78th anniversary of the Nanking Massacre
 December 20a landslide happened in Guangming New Industrial Zone, Shenzhen, Guangdong. It has caused 7 deaths and about 75 to be missing, 16 are hospitalized. It is reported as man-made accident.

 December 28China approves an anti-terrorism law. US Government criticizes that China would use it as an excuse to corrupt its religious, company, speech and various freedom.
 December 31The PLA's Leader Department of Land Army, Rocket Army and Strategic Supportive Force established. Central Military Commission Chairman Xi Jinping masters the establishment ceremony.

Culture
 List of Chinese films of 2015

Sport

Association football
Chinese Super League season: 2015 Chinese Super League
China League One season: 2015 China League One
China League Two season: 2015 China League Two
Chinese FA Cup season: 2015 Chinese FA Cup

Deaths 
April 8 Rayson Huang, 94, Chinese chemist, vice-chancellor of the University of Hong Kong (1972–1986). 
April 9 Tsien Tsuen-hsuin, 105, Chinese-born American sinologist, professor, and librarian. 
April 10 Jin Youzhi, 96, last surviving sibling of Puyi, the final ruler of the Qing Dynasty and last Emperor of China. 
May 27 Zhang Jieqing, 102, Chinese politician and writer.
October 9 Du Runsheng, 102, Chinese reformer and economist.
December 4 Xu Ming, 44, Chinese entrepreneur and billionaire.
December 6 Liu Juying, 98, Chinese politician and army general.

Other
September 25, 2014 – March 22, 2015 – 2014–2015 Chinese Short Track Speed Skating League
January 4–10 – 2015 Shenzhen Open
March 23–29 – 2015 World Figure Skating Championships, in Shanghai
April 6–12 – 2015 IIHF Women's World Championship Division I Group B
April 24 – November 1 – 2015 China F4 Championship season
April 26–3 May – 2015 World Table Tennis Championships, in Suzhou
5–10 May – 2015 Archery World Cup first leg, in Shanghai
August 22–30 – 2015 World Championships in Athletics, in Beijing
2015 Archery World Cup
2015 EAFF East Asian Cup
2015 FIBA Asia Championship for Women
2015 IAAF World Cross Country Championships, in Guiyang
2015 Sudirman Cup, in Dongguan

See also
 List of Chinese films of 2015

References

 
China
Years of the 21st century in China
2010s in China
China